The Battle of Nanning was fought between the invading Yunnan Army, allied to Chiang Kai-shek's faction, and the defending forces of the New Guangxi clique.

Bibliography
中華民國國防大學編，《中國現代軍事史主要戰役表》
Conflicts in 1930